The canton of Morestel is an administrative division of the Isère department, eastern France. Its borders were modified at the French canton reorganisation which came into effect in March 2015. Its seat is in Morestel.

It consists of the following communes:
 
Arandon-Passins
Les Avenières-Veyrins-Thuellin
La Balme-les-Grottes
Le Bouchage
Bouvesse-Quirieu
Brangues
Charette
Corbelin
Courtenay
Creys-Mépieu
Montalieu-Vercieu
Morestel
Optevoz
Parmilieu
Porcieu-Amblagnieu
Saint-Sorlin-de-Morestel
Saint-Victor-de-Morestel
Sermérieu
Soleymieu
Vasselin
Vertrieu
Vézeronce-Curtin
Vignieu

References

Cantons of Isère